The Master of Arguis was an Aragonese artist active in the first half of the 15th century.  Stylistically, his work is related to that of Juan de Levi and Bonanat Zaortiga, and is derived from the tradition of the International Gothic in Aragon.  His name is derived from a retable of Saint Michael dating to about 1440, now in the Museo del Prado in Madrid; this was once the main altarpiece of the church of Arguis.  The painting depicts the victory of Michael over the Antichrist, and focuses primarily on the latter figure, pierced with a lance.  Included in the scene are various secular figures, including kings and noblemen, as well as religious figures.  At the bottom of the image may be seen a papal tiara and sceptre, symbols of the power the Antichrist claims to wield as the new Messiah.  Two other paintings, both dedicated to Saint Anne, are attributed to the Master; one is in Barcelona, while the other, a small triptych, is in the collegiate church of Alquezar.

References
 Savirón Paulino Esteban: report on the acquisition of works of art and antiquity in the provinces of Aragon. Towards the National Archaeological Museum. Printing and dumb Deaf and National Association of the Blind, Madrid 1871.
 Savirón Paulino Esteban: Aragon on board the fifteenth century preserved in the National Archaeological Museum Paintings. In: Spanish Museum of Antiquities. Bd. 10 1880, ZDB-ID 330919–8, S. 71–83.
 Elias Tormo and Monzo: The Quattrocento painting and Aragonese Retrospective Exhibition of Zaragoza in general. In: Bulletin of the Spanish Society of Tours. Bd. 17, nr. 4, 1909, pp. 277–285.
 Post Rathfon Chandler: A History of Spanish Painting. Band 2: The Franco-Gothic, the Italo-Gothic and international styles. Harvard University Press, Cambridge MA 1930.
 Arguis von Meister. In: Ulrich Thieme, Felix Becker u. Band 37, E. A. Seemann, Leipzig 1950.
 Torralba Federico Soriano: File Aragonese contemporary artists. In: Seminar on Art Aragon. Nr. 6, 1954, S. 122–127.
 Josep Gudiol: medieval painting in Aragon (= Institution "Ferdinand" Publication number 488) Institution "Ferdinand", Zaragoza 1971.
 José María Azcárate: gothic art in Spain. Chair, Madrid 1990, .
 Heinrich Krauss, Eva Uthemann: Was Bilder erzählen. Klassischen Die Antike und Geschichten aus der Christenthum in abendländischen Malerei. 5 Auflage. Beck, München 2003, .
 Laclotte Michel, Jean Pierre Cuzin, Arnauld Pierre (Ed.): (Larousse) Dictionnaire de la peinture. Nouvelle édition. Larousse, Paris 2003, .

Arguis, Master of
15th-century Spanish painters